Prineville is a city in and the seat of Crook County, Oregon, United States. It was named for the first merchant located in the present location, Barney Prine. The population was 9,253 at the 2010 census.

History 
Prineville was founded in 1877 when Monroe Hodges filed the original plat for the city. The post office for the community had been established with the name of Prine on April 13, 1871, but changed to Prineville on December 23, 1872. The city was incorporated by the Oregon Legislative Assembly on October 23, 1880, and obtained its first high school in 1902.

Long the major town in central Oregon, Prineville was snubbed in 1911 when the railroad tycoons James J. Hill and Edward H. Harriman bypassed the city as they laid track south from The Dalles.

Helped by timber harvests from the nearby Ochoco National Forest, the City of Prineville Railroad prospered for decades. The profits from the railroad were so abundant that between 1964 and 1968, the city levied no property taxes. However, with the decline of the timber industry in Oregon, the railroad reported a loss of nearly $1 million between 2002 and 2004.

Apple and Facebook have invested over a billion dollars, each, in multiple data centers within Prineville City limits, in the past 8 years.

Geography and climate

During the Miocene and Oligocene, great basaltic flows swept through the area. Barnes Butte is a prominent butte of this activity, located partially within the city.

Prineville has a cool semi-arid climate (BSk) according to the Köppen climate classification system.

Demographics

2010 census
As of the census of 2010, there were 9,253 people, 3,692 households, and 2,407 families residing in the city. The racial makeup of the city was 90.4% White, 0.2% African American, 1.5% Native American, 0.7% Asian, 0.1% Pacific Islander, 4.9% from other races, and 2.2% from two or more races. Hispanic or Latino of any race were 10.1% of the population.

There were 3,692 households, of which 32.9% had children under the age of 18 living with them, 46.8% were married couples living together, 13.5% had a female householder with no husband present, 4.9% had a male householder with no wife present, and 34.8% were non-families. 29.3% of all households were made up of individuals, and 13.4% had someone living alone who was 65 years of age or older. The average household size was 2.44 and the average family size was 2.98.

The median age in the city was 38.2 years. 25.5% of residents were under the age of 18; 7.5% were between the ages of 18 and 24; 24.9% were from 25 to 44; 24.6% were from 45 to 64; and 17.4% were 65 years of age or older. The gender makeup of the city was 48.1% male and 51.9% female.

2000 census
As of the census of 2000, there were 7,356 people, 2,817 households, and 1,907 families residing in the city. The population density was 1,105.9 people per square mile (427.1/km). There were 3,022 housing units at an average density of 454.3 per square mile (175.5/km). The racial makeup of the city was 91.80% White, 0.01% African American, 1.50% Native American, 0.73% Asian, 0.01% Pacific Islander, 4.50% from other races, and 1.44% from two or more races. Hispanic or Latino of any race were 7.42% of the population.

Of the 2,817 households, 35.8% had children under the age of 18 living with them, 51.4% were married couples living together, 11.7% had a female householder with no husband present, and 32.3% were non-families. 27.1% of all households were made up of individuals, and 13.2% had someone living alone who was 65 years of age or older. The average household size was 2.55 and the average family size was 3.09.

In the city, the population was spread out, with 29.3% under the age of 18, 9.6% from 18 to 24, 27.0% from 25 to 44, 18.6% from 45 to 64, and 15.5% who were 65 years of age or older. The median age was 33 years. For every 100 females, there were 93.1 males. For every 100 females age 18 and over, there were 88.0 males.

The median income for a household in the city was $30,435, and the median income for a family was $36,587. Males had a median income of $31,224 versus $22,852 for females. The per capita income for the city was $14,163. About 10.0% of families and 14.3% of the population were below the poverty line, including 16.6% of those under age 18 and 13.1% of those age 65 or over.

Economy
Les Schwab Tire Centers, a chain of tire stores based in Prineville, has been associated with the city since the company's founding in 1952. As of 2022, the Les Schwab Tire Center chain operates more than 500 stores in California, Idaho, Montana, Nevada, Oregon, Utah, and Washington, does more than $1.5 billion in sales each year, and according to the AP, is the number two private tire retailer in the United States. The company announced on December 12, 2006, that it would be moving the corporate headquarters to nearby Bend, where a growing number of its executives live, including Dick Borgman who became CEO on the same day. In 2006, journalist Mike Rogoway noted:

A decade ago, Schwab could have devastated Prineville by pulling out. Now, though, the city that suffered through the downturn in the wood products industry is enjoying an economic renaissance. Federal jobs with the Bureau of Land Management and Forest Service help anchor the economy [Judge Scott Cooper, Crook County administrator, was quoted], while a housing boom and a growing tourism industry have diversified the area.

Prineville got its first Starbucks in 2006, and a plan was floated to reopen the city's long-shuttered movie theater. In December 2006, unemployment was 4.4 percent, the lowest since the 1960s.

In 2010, Prineville was selected as the location for a new data center for Facebook. This center has been met with criticism from environmental groups such as Greenpeace because the power utility company contracted for the center, PacifiCorp, generates 70 percent of its electricity from coal. Since 2010, Facebook has funded multiple projects in Prineville, including water mains and new devices at local schools{cn}.

On February 21, 2012, Apple announced that it would open a "Green Data Center" on a  tract of land owned by the company.

Both Apple and Facebook have invested over a billion dollars, each, in multiple data centers within Prineville City limits, in the past eight years.

Media
Prineville Territory Magazine is a seasonal magazine covering the life and history of the Territory.

The Central Oregonian is a twice-weekly newspaper published in Prineville. Located at 558 N Main St, Prineville.

There are three commercial radio stations licensed to Prineville:
KRCO at 690 kHz (rebroadcast on 96.9 FM),
KRCO-FM at 95.7 MHz (rebroadcast in 93.7 FM) and
KNLX at 104.9 MHz.

Transportation
Prineville Airport
U.S. Route 26
Oregon Route 126
The city of Prineville has a municipally owned railway, the City of Prineville Railway, which was established in 1918.

Education

Elementary school 

 Barnes Butte Elementary
 Crooked River Elementary
 Cascade Virtual Academy

Middle school 

 Crook County Middle School

High school 

 Crook County High School
 Pioneer Secondary Alternative High School

Higher Education 

 COCC Prineville

References

External links
Entry for Prineville in the Oregon Blue Book
Prineville Chamber of Commerce

 
Cities in Oregon
Cities in Crook County, Oregon
County seats in Oregon
Micropolitan areas of Oregon
Populated places established in 1877
1877 establishments in Oregon